Thermonotus nigripennis is a species of beetle in the family Cerambycidae. It was described by Ritsema in 1896. It is known from Malaysia, Brunei, Borneo and the Philippines.

References

Lamiini
Beetles described in 1896